The Baseballs are a German rock and roll band founded in Berlin in 2007. They became popular with 1950s and 1960s style rock cover versions of modern hits such as "Umbrella" by Rihanna, "Crazy in Love" by Beyoncé, "Hot n Cold" by Katy Perry and "Call Me Maybe" by Carly Rae Jepsen. The band members are only credited by their nicknames (Sam, Digger and Basti). Their version of "Umbrella" was a hit in Germany, Spain, the Netherlands, Belgium, Finland, Iceland, Austria, Switzerland, Sweden and Norway.

Musical career
Their debut album, Strike!, was produced by JMC Music and released in May 2009 in Germany, Switzerland and Austria, in October 2009 in Finland, in December 2009 in Sweden, in February in Norway and in March 2010 in The Netherlands. It reached No. 15 in Austria, No. 6 in Germany, No. 2 in Switzerland and the Netherlands, No. 1 in Finland, No. 1 in Sweden and No. 1 in the Norwegian album charts. In the UK it was released on Rhino Records UK on 17 May 2010.

The band re-released the album in 2010 as Strike! Back! The lead single is a rockabilly version of Snow Patrol's "Chasing Cars." The video features the band rocking a 1950s prom.

In the UK, The Baseballs have appeared on ITV1's The David Dickinson Show, Magic Numbers and This Morning. In Ireland, The Baseballs have appeared on RTÉ's The Late Late Show. In Australia the group appeared on Channel 9's Hey Hey It's Saturday In New Zealand they appeared on TVNZ's Good Morning

In 2010 the band supported guitarist Jeff Beck on his "Emotion and Commotion" tour as his opening act.

On 6 June 2011, the Baseballs released their second album titled Strings 'n' Stripes. It included new singles tracks such as Candy Shop, Hello and Paparazzi. 

On 1 August 2011, the Baseballs released together with General Mills – the producer of the ice cream Häagen-Dazs – within an advertising campaign with Cosma Shiva Hagen a free download of the song "Wha Wha" – which was written especially for the campaign. The track is freely available and can be downloaded from the German site of the brand Häagen-Dazs.

On 25 May 2012, the Baseballs released their first live CD/DVD, "Strings 'n' Stripes Live".

Discography

Studio albums

Singles

Various releases
 2011: "Wha Wha" (Promotional)
 2016: "...Baby One More Time"
 2019: Cadillac Maniac ft. Kissin Dynamite
 2020: "Don't Worry, Be Happy"
 2020: "Take On Me"
 2020: Wake Me Up Before You Go-Go
 2021: Rock Me Amadeus

Awards

References

External links
 Official Website

German rock music groups
Musical groups from Berlin
Rockabilly music groups
Vocal trios
German musical trios
Cover bands